Blackfield II is the second studio album by Blackfield. It was recorded in both Tel Aviv and London, and was released on 13 February 2007 in Europe and 6 March 2007 in the US.

We Put Out Records launched a media site relating to the US release of this record.

"End of the World" is a cover of an older song in Hebrew, performed by Geffen and Berry Sakharof. Hebrew versions of "1,000 People" and "Epidemic" were included in Geffen's album from 2006, "Im Hazman". A demo version of "Where Is My Love?" was released on the bonus disc of the limited edition of Blackfield's first album.

"Christenings" was originally written for Porcupine Tree's 2005 album Deadwing but was never released. Richard Barbieri and Gavin Harrison are both featured on this track.

Track listing
All songs written by Aviv Geffen except where noted.

Reception
Q: "... an album of mournful, one-paced rock, Geffen's infatuation with Radiohead very evident in the melancholy synth-string washes.  Miss U is the standout, although the Genesis-esque End of the World comes close."

Personnel 

Blackfield
 Aviv Geffen - keyboards, additional guitars, vocals
 Steven Wilson - guitars, additional keyboards, vocals
 Daniel Salomon - piano
 Seffy Efrati - bass guitar
 Tomer Z - drums, percussion

Vocal duties
 lead vocals: 1, 2, 4, 5, 7, 8 - Steven Wilson
 lead vocals: 3 - Aviv Geffen
 lead vocals: 6, 9, 10 - Steven Wilson and Aviv Geffen

Guest musicians
 Ofer Meiri - additional keyboards and programming on "1,000 People"
 Harel Ben-Ami - electric and acoustic guitars on "1,000 People"
 Itamar Leshem - french horn on "1,000 People"
 Richard Barbieri - electric piano and stylophone on "Christenings"
 Gavin Harrison - drums on "Christenings"
 Daniela Pick - backing vocals on "Epidemic"
 Eran Mitelman - electric piano on "My Gift of Silence"
 String arrangements by Aviv Geffen, performed by The Downtown Session Orchestra, under the direction of Daniel Salomon.

Production
Steven Wilson – producer, mixer
Reuven Schapira – recording engineer
Carl Glover – artwork, photography and design
Robin – band photography

Chart positions
 Billboard Top Heatseekers (Middle Atlantic): #9
 Billboard Top Heatseekers (Northeast): #6
 Billboard Top Heatseekers: #31
 Billboard Top Internet Albums: #25

References

2007 albums
Blackfield albums